Mount Vernon is a city in and the county seat of Lawrence County, Missouri, United States. The population was 4,575 as of the 2010 census. It was estimated to be 4,960 by the City of Mount Vernon on July 1, 2020.

History
Mount Vernon was platted in 1845. The city was named after Mount Vernon, the estate of George Washington. A post office called Mount Vernon has been in operation since 1846.

Lawrence County Courthouse and Old Spanish Fort Archeological Site are listed on the National Register of Historic Places.

Geography

Demographics

2010 census
As of the census of 2010, there were 4,575 people, 1,810 households, and 1,101 families living in the city. The racial makeup of the city was 95.3% White, 0.4% African American, 1.3% Native American, 0.5% Asian, 0.6% from other races, and 1.9% from two or more races. Hispanic or Latino of any race were 2.1% of the population.

There were 1,810 households, of which 31.3% had children under the age of 18 living with them, 42.5% were married couples living together, 14.3% had a female householder with no husband present, 4.0% had a male householder with no wife present, and 39.2% were non-families. 34.8% of all households were made up of individuals, and 16.6% had someone living alone who was 65 years of age or older. The average household size was 2.31 and the average family size was 2.96.

The median age in the city was 40.3 years. 24.1% of residents were under the age of 18; 7.4% were between the ages of 18 and 24; 23.1% were from 25 to 44; 23.6% were from 45 to 64; and 21.7% were 65 years of age or older. The gender makeup of the city was 48.6% male and 51.4% female.

2000 census
As of the census of 2000, there were 4,017 people, 1,606 households, and 1,005 families living in the city. The population density was 1,173.4 people per square mile (453.5/km2). There were 1,730 housing units at an average density of 505.3 per square mile (195.3/km2). The racial makeup of the city was 96.61% White, 0.67% African American, 0.92% Native American, 0.27% Asian, 0.55% from other races, and 0.97% from two or more races. Hispanic or Latino of any race were 1.22% of the population.

There were 1,606 households, out of which 28.1% had children under the age of 18 living with them, 46.9% were married couples living together, 12.4% had a female householder with no husband present, and 37.4% were non-families. 33.8% of all households were made up of individuals, and 16.3% had someone living alone who was 65 years of age or older. The average household size was 2.27 and the average family size was 2.89.

In the city, the population was spread out, with 23.3% under the age of 18, 8.6% from 18 to 24, 23.4% from 25 to 44, 21.7% from 45 to 64, and 23.0% who were 65 years of age or older. The median age was 41 years. For every 100 females, there were 92.9 males. For every 100 females age 18 and over, there were 86.2 males.

The median income for a household in the city was $28,628, and the median income for a family was $34,848. Males had a median income of $27,665 versus $20,234 for females. The per capita income for the city was $16,210. About 10.5% of families and 13.7% of the population were below the poverty line, including 24.0% of those under age 18 and 11.2% of those age 65 or over.

Education
Mt. Vernon R-V School District operates one elementary school, one intermediate school, one middle school, and Mt. Vernon High School.

The Mount Vernon High School "Lady Mountaineers" won the Missouri Class 3A girls basketball state championship in 2010 and 2012.

Mount Vernon has a public library, a branch of the Barry-Lawrence Regional Library.

Arts and culture
In October, the city hosts "Apple Butter Makin' Days", an annual food festival.

Notable people
Julia Butterfly Hill, environmental activist
Bobby Berk, interior design expert, Queer Eye

References

External links
 Official website
 Historic maps of Mount Vernon in the Sanborn Maps of Missouri Collection at the University of Missouri

Cities in Lawrence County, Missouri
County seats in Missouri
Cities in Missouri